is a railway station operated by JR West in Shūnan, Yamaguchi, and serves as the transfer point between Sanyō Main Line and the Gantoku Line. It is located in the Tokuyama part of Shūnan.

History

February 11, 1928: Station opens
May 29, 1932: The Gantoku Line opens between this station and Suō-Hanaoka Station.
April 1, 1987: Station operation is taken over by JR West after privatization of Japanese National Railways

Layout
The station has four tracks, with one side platform and one island platform serving the Sanyō Main Line, and one island platform serving the Gantoku line. Each of the platforms is connected by an overpass at the southeast end of the station.

Platforms

See also
 List of railway stations in Japan

External links

  
 Shūnan City website 

Railway stations in Japan opened in 1928
Sanyō Main Line
Hiroshima City Network
Railway stations in Yamaguchi Prefecture
Shūnan, Yamaguchi